Prospherysa is a genus of flies in the family Tachinidae.

Species
P. aemulans Wulp, 1890
P. mimela (Reinhard, 1953)
P. pulverea (Coquillett, 1897)

References

Exoristinae
Diptera of North America
Tachinidae genera
Taxa named by Frederik Maurits van der Wulp